The African linsangs also known as oyans are two species classified in the mammalian subfamily Viverrinae, in the family Viverridae. There is one genus, Poiana.

The name linsang is from Javanese linsang or wlinsang, which used to be wrongly translated as "otter" in English dictionaries. Linsangs are nocturnal, generally solitary tree dwellers. They are carnivorous, eating squirrels and other rodents, small birds, lizards and insects. Typical size is a little over 30 cm (1 foot), with a tail that more than doubles that length. Bodies are long, with short legs, giving a low appearance. Both species have yellowish bodies with black markings (stripes, blotches and spots), though the distribution and nature of the markings varies between the two species.

Taxonomy
The genus Poiana was erected by John Edward Gray in a paper read at the 8 November 1864 meeting of the Zoological Society of London and published the following year, in the Proceedings of the Zoological Society of London relating to 1864. In accordance with Article 8 of the ICZN Code, the correct author citation is "Gray, 1865".

Both linsang genera (Poiana and the Asian Prionodon) were formerly placed in the subfamily Viverrinae (of Viverridae), along with several other genera, but recent research suggests that their actual relationships may be somewhat different; a 2020 checklist places them instead in the subfamily Genettinae. The linsangs are remarkable for their morphological resemblance to cats, family Felidae, which is greater than in the other viverrids. As the relationship between linsangs and cats was thought to be rather distant (the two groups belonging to different families within the superfamily Feliformia), this was considered an example of convergent evolution. However, DNA analysis indicates that while the African linsangs (Poiana) are true viverrids closely related to the genets, the Asiatic linsangs (Prionodon) are not and may instead be the closest living relatives of the family Felidae. The similarities between Asiatic linsangs and cats are thus more likely to be due to common ancestry, while the similarities between the two genera of linsangs must be convergent.

The species of African linsangs are:
Poiana leightoni - West African oyan
Poiana richardsonii - Central African oyan

References

Viverrids
 
 
Taxa named by John Edward Gray